Forum station is a rapid transit station on the Copenhagen Metro in Frederiksberg, Denmark. The station opened in 2003. It serves the M1 and M2 lines and connects with bus services. The station lies adjacent to Forum Copenhagen, a large special events venue, which has given the station its name. The station is in fare zone 1.

The station has bicycle parking facilities.

References

External links
Forum station on www.m.dk 
Forum station on www.m.dk 

M1 (Copenhagen Metro) stations
M2 (Copenhagen Metro) stations
Railway stations opened in 2003
Railway stations in Denmark opened in the 21st century